The Tegernsee is a Zungenbecken lake in the Bavarian Alps in southern Germany. Resorts on the lake include the eponymous Tegernsee, as well as Bad Wiessee, Kreuth, Gmund, and Rottach-Egern.

The lake flows into the River Mangfall, a tributary of the River Inn and thence the River Danube.

The buildings of the former Benedictine monastery of Tegernsee Abbey lie on the banks of the lake. Now in private hands, they are now known as Schloss Tegernsee.

The area around the lake is linked to Munich by rail through trains of the Bayerische Oberlandbahn, which, in the final part of their journey, travel over the tracks of the privately owned Tegernsee-Bahn. Pleasure boat services serve several points on the lake, and are operated by boats of the Bayerische Seenschifffahrt company.

Adolf Hitler owned a house on the shores of Tegernsee and reclused here following the suicide of his niece, Geli Raubal, in 1931.

External links

Tourism information for Lake Tegernsee
Information and webcam about Lake Tegernsee
Tourism website for Lake Tegernsee

Lakes of Bavaria
LTegernsee
Miesbach (district)